Folkbladet (Swedish: The People's Paper) is a Swedish-language newspaper published in Norrköping, Sweden. The paper has been in circulation since 1905.

History and profile

The paper was founded by workers with the name Östergötlands Folkblad in 1905. In 1998 it was renamed Folkbladet. The paper is headquartered in Norrköping and is owned by the Norrköping Tidningar AB (NTM Group). The company acquired the paper in 2000. Norrköpings Tidningar became its sister paper of following this acquisition. Before this transaction Folkbladet had a social democratic political stance. During this period one of the contributors was Lars Stjernkvist, a social democrat politician and future secretary general of the Swedish Social Democratic Party. 

In 2010 Folkbladet sold 6,500 copies.

See also
List of Swedish newspapers

References

External links
  
 

1905 establishments in Sweden
Mass media in Norrköping
Daily newspapers published in Sweden
Newspapers established in 1905
Swedish-language newspapers